Nossiter is a surname of English origin.

Notable bearers of the name include

 Bernard Nossiter American journalist: father of Jonathan (see below)
Dorrie Nossiter   British Jewelry designer
Jonathan Nossiter American Film director
Maria Isabella Nossiter (1735–1759), English actress
Thomas Nossiter   L.S.E professor
 Clarence Frank Nossiter British Engineer